Agnes Katharina Maxsein (December 4, 1904 – October 31, 1991) was a German politician of the Christian Democratic Union (CDU) and former member of the German Bundestag.

Life 
Maxsein participated in the founding of the CDU Berlin and was its deputy state chairman from 1946 to 1948. From 1946 to 1952 Maxsein was a member of the Berlin state parliament. From 1949 to 1952 she was vice president of the Chamber of Deputies. With the increase in the number of Berlin deputies on February 1, 1952, Maxsein entered the German Bundestag, of which she was a member until 1969.

Literature

References

1904 births
1991 deaths
Members of the Bundestag for Berlin
Members of the Bundestag 1965–1969
Members of the Bundestag 1961–1965
Members of the Bundestag 1957–1961
Members of the Bundestag 1953–1957
Members of the Bundestag 1949–1953
Members of the Bundestag for the Christian Democratic Union of Germany
Members of the Abgeordnetenhaus of Berlin
20th-century German women politicians